Second Story may refer to:

Second Story Press
Second Story Interactive Studios
Second Story (The Hang Ups album)
Second Story (ClariS album)
Second Story, album Open House (band)
Second Story, album Park Hyo-shin

See also: